= Bond s knopkoy =

Russian band

Bond s knopkoy (Russian: Бонд с кнопкой) is a Russian band, whose breakthrough came with the song Kukhni in 2025.
